In mathematics, the lexicographic or lexicographical order (also known as lexical order, or dictionary order) is a generalization of the alphabetical order of the dictionaries to sequences of ordered symbols or, more generally, of elements of a totally ordered set.

There are several variants and generalizations of the lexicographical ordering. One variant applies to sequences of different lengths by comparing the lengths of the sequences before considering their elements.

Another variant, widely used in combinatorics, orders subsets of a given finite set by assigning a total order to the finite set, and converting subsets into increasing sequences, to which the lexicographical order is applied. 

A generalization defines an order on a Cartesian product of partially ordered sets; this order is a total order if and only if all factors of the Cartesian product are totally ordered.

Motivation and definition

The words in a lexicon (the set of words used in some language) have a conventional ordering, used in dictionaries and encyclopedias, that depends on the underlying ordering of the alphabet of symbols used to build the words. The lexicographical order is one way of formalizing word order given the order of the underlying symbols.

The formal notion starts with a finite set , often called the alphabet, which is totally ordered.

The lexicographical order on the set of all these finite words orders the words as follows:

 If two words have different lengths, the usual lexicographical order pads the shorter one with "blanks" (a special symbol that is treated as smaller than every element of ) at the end until the words are the same length, and then the words are compared as in the previous case.

However, in combinatorics, another convention is frequently used for the second case, whereby a shorter sequence is always smaller than a longer sequence. This variant of the lexicographical order is sometimes called .

In lexicographical order, the word "Thomas" appears before "Thompson" because they first differ at the fifth letter ('a' and 'p'), and letter 'a' comes before the letter 'p' in the alphabet. Because it is the first difference, in this case the 5th letter is the "most significant difference" for alphabetical ordering.

An important property of the lexicographical order is that for each , the set of words of length  is well-ordered by the lexicographical order (provided the alphabet is finite); that is, every decreasing sequence of words of length  is finite (or equivalently, every non-empty subset has a least element). It is not true that the set of all finite words is well-ordered; for example, the infinite set of words {b, ab, aab, aaab, ... } has no lexicographically earliest element.

Numeral systems and dates

The lexicographical order is used not only in dictionaries, but also commonly for numbers and dates.

One of the drawbacks of the Roman numeral system is that it is not always immediately obvious which of two numbers is the smaller. On the other hand, with the positional notation of the Hindu–Arabic numeral system, comparing numbers is easy, because the natural order on nonnegative integers is the same as the variant shortlex of the lexicographic order. In fact, with positional notation, a nonnegative integer is represented by a sequence of numerical digits, and an integer is larger than another one if either it has more digits (ignoring leading zeroes) or the number of digits is the same and the first (most significant) digit which differs is larger.

For real numbers written in decimal notation, a slightly different variant of the lexicographical order is used: the parts on the left of the decimal point are compared as before; if they are equal, the parts at the right of the decimal point are compared with the lexicographical order. The padding 'blank' in this context is a trailing "0" digit.

When negative numbers are also considered, one has to reverse the order for comparing negative numbers. This is not usually a problem for humans, but it may be for computers (testing the sign takes some time). This is one of the reasons for adopting two's complement representation for representing signed integers in computers.

Another example of a non-dictionary use of lexicographical ordering appears in the ISO 8601 standard for dates, which expresses a date as YYYY-MM-DD. This formatting scheme has the advantage that the lexicographical order on sequences of characters that represent dates coincides with the chronological order: an earlier CE date is smaller in the lexicographical order than a later date up to year 9999. This date ordering makes computerized sorting of dates easier by avoiding the need for a separate sorting algorithm.

Monoid of words

A word  is a prefix (or 'truncation') of another word  if there exists a word  such that . By this definition, the empty word is a prefix of every word, and every word is a prefix of itself (with  ); care must be taken if these cases are to be excluded.

  is a prefix of 

Notice that, due to the prefix condition in this definition,  where  is the empty word.

If  is a total order on  then so is the lexicographic order on the words of  However, in general this is not a well-order, even if the alphabet  is well-ordered. For instance, if , the language  has no least element in the lexicographical order: .

Since many applications require well orders, a variant of the lexicographical orders is often used.

Cartesian products

The lexicographical order defines an order on a Cartesian product of ordered sets, which is a total order when all these sets are themselves totally ordered.

The result is a partial order. The lexicographical order of two totally ordered sets is thus a linear extension of their product order.

One can define similarly the lexicographic order on the Cartesian product of an infinite family of ordered sets, if the family is indexed by the nonnegative integers, or more generally by a well-ordered set. This generalized lexicographical order is a total order if each factor set is totally ordered.

Unlike the finite case, an infinite product of well-orders is not necessarily well-ordered by the lexicographical order. For instance, the set of countably infinite binary sequences (by definition, the set of functions from non-negative integers to  also known as the Cantor space ) is not well-ordered; the subset of sequences that have precisely one  (that is) does not have a least element under the lexicographical order induced by  because  is an infinite descending chain. Similarly, the infinite lexicographic product is not Noetherian either because  is an infinite ascending chain.

Functions over a well-ordered set

As shown above, if  is infinite this is not the case.

Finite subsets

In this context, one generally prefer to sort first the subsets by cardinality, such as in the shortlex order. Therefore, in the following, we will consider only orders on subsets of fixed cardinal.

 
.

For ordering finite subsets of a given cardinality of the natural numbers, the  order (see below) is often more convenient, because all initial segments are finite, and thus the colexicographical order defines an order isomorphism between the natural numbers and the set of sets of  natural numbers. This is not the case for the lexicographical order, as, with the lexicographical order, we have, for example,  for every

Group orders of Zn

Let  be the free Abelian group of rank  whose elements are sequences of  integers, and operation is the addition.

The lexicographical ordering is a group order on 

The lexicographical ordering may also be used to characterize all group orders on  In fact,  linear forms with real coefficients, define a map from  into  which is injective if the forms are linearly independent (it may be also injective if the forms are dependent, see below). The lexicographic order on the image of this map induces a group order on  Robbiano's theorem is that every group order may be obtained in this way.

More precisely, given a group order on  there exist an integer  and  linear forms with real coefficients, such that the induced map  from  into  has the following properties;

  is injective;

Colexicographic order

The colexicographic or colex order is a variant of the lexicographical order that is obtained by reading finite sequences from the right to the left instead of reading them from the left to the right.  More precisely, whereas the lexicographical order between two sequences is defined by

 if  for the first  where  and  differ,
the colexicographical order is defined by

 if  for the last  where  and  differ

In general, the difference between the colexicographical order and the lexicographical order is not very significant. However, when considering increasing sequences, typically for coding subsets, the two orders differ significantly.

For example, for ordering the increasing sequences (or the sets) of two natural integers, the lexicographical order begins by

, 

and the colexicographic order begins by

.

The main property of the colexicographical order for increasing sequences of a given length is that every initial segment is finite. In other words, the colexicographical order for increasing sequences of a given length induces an order isomorphism with the natural numbers, and allows enumerating these sequences. This is frequently used in combinatorics, for example in the proof of the Kruskal–Katona theorem.

Monomials

When considering polynomials, the order of the terms does not matter in general, as the addition is commutative. However, some algorithms, such as polynomial long division, require the terms to be in a specific order. Many of the main algorithms for multivariate polynomials are related with Gröbner bases, concept that requires the choice of a monomial order, that is a total order, which is compatible with the monoid structure of the monomials. Here "compatible" means that  if the monoid operation is denoted multiplicatively. This compatibility implies that the product of a polynomial by a monomial does not change the order of the terms. For Gröbner bases, a further condition must be satisfied, namely that every non constant monomial is greater than the monomial . However this condition is not needed for other related algorithms, such as the algorithms for the computation of the tangent cone.

As Gröbner bases are defined for polynomials in a fixed number of variables, it is common to identify monomials (for example ) with their exponent vectors (here ).

One of these admissible orders is the lexicographical order. It is, historically, the first to have been used for defining Gröbner bases, and is sometimes called  for distinguishing it from other orders that are also related to a lexicographical order.

Another one consists in comparing first the total degrees, and then resolving the conflicts by using the lexicographical order. This order is not widely used, as either the lexicographical order or the degree reverse lexicographical order have generally better properties.

The  consists also in comparing first the total degrees, and, in case of equality of the total degrees, using the reverse of the colexicographical order. That is, given two exponent vectors, one has 

if either 

or

For this ordering, the monomials of degree one have the same order as the corresponding indeterminates (this would not be the case if the reverse lexicographical order would be used).  For comparing monomials in two variables of the same total degree, this order is the same as the lexicographic order. This is not the case with more variables. For example, for exponent vectors of monomials of degree two in three variables, one has for the degree reverse lexicographic order:

For the lexicographical order, the same exponent vectors are ordered as

A useful property of the degree reverse lexicographical order is that a homogeneous polynomial is a multiple of the least indeterminate if and only if its leading monomial (its greater monomial) is a multiple of this least indeterminate.

See also

 Collation
 Kleene–Brouwer order
 Lexicographic preferences - an application of lexicographic order in economics.
 Lexicographic optimization - an algorithmic problem of finding a lexicographically-maximal element.
 Lexicographic order topology on the unit square
 Lexicographic ordering in tensor abstract index notation
 Lexicographically minimal string rotation
 Leximin order
 Long line (topology)
 Lyndon word
 Star product, a different way of combining partial orders
 Shortlex order
 Orders on the Cartesian product of totally ordered sets

References

External links 
 

Order theory
Lexicography